The 1918–19 Luxembourg National Division was the 9th season of top level association football in Luxembourg.

Overview
It was contested by 6 teams, and Sporting Club Luxembourg won the championship.

League standings

Results

References
Luxembourg - List of final tables (RSSSF)

1918-19
1918–19 in European association football leagues
Nat